Dark Companions is a collection of horror stories by Ramsey Campbell, first published by Macmillan Publishers in 1982. It contains an introduction by the author.

The stories included are:

 "The Chimney"
 "Down There"
 "Above the World"
 "Napier Court"
 "Out of Copyright"
 "The Depths"
 "The Man in the Underpass"
 "Vacant Possession"
 "The Little Voice"
 "Drawing In"
 "The Trick"
 "Heading Home"
 "The Show Goes On"
 "The Change"
 "Calling Card"
 "Baby"
 "In the Bag"
 "Conversion"
 "Mackintosh Willy"
 "Call First"
 "The Companion"

1982 short story collections
Fantasy short story collections
Horror short story collections